Roland West (born June 6, 1944) is an American former National Basketball Association (NBA) player for the Baltimore Bullets.

West attended Withrow High School in Cincinnati and played college basketball at the University of Cincinnati.

West lettered from 1964–65 to 1966–67 for the Bearcats. As a sophomore starting forward in 1964–65, he averaged 11.0 points and 4.7 rebounds while leading the team in assists (2.6) and blocks (1.3) as the Bearcats went 14-12.

In his junior season of 1965–66, West helped UC to a 21-7 record, the 1966 Missouri Valley Conference championship while averaging 15.5 points and a team-high 9.4 rebounds.

West received a bachelor's degree in Education from Cincinnati.

West was drafted with the first pick in the 20th round of the 1967 NBA draft.

He played in four games for the Bullets in the 1967–68 NBA season and recorded a total of four points and five rebounds.

West is president and chief executive officer of Roland D. West & Associates Inc., a business consulting firm in Cincinnati. He is a former chair of the Greater Cincinnati area United Negro College Fund campaign. He and his wife, Yvonne, are longtime supporters of UNCF and its mission.

In 2013, West was inducted into the Greater Cincinnati Basketball Hall of Fame.

References

1944 births
Living people
American men's basketball players
Baltimore Bullets (1963–1973) draft picks
Baltimore Bullets (1963–1973) players
Basketball players from Cincinnati
Cincinnati Bearcats men's basketball players
Guards (basketball)
Wilmington Blue Bombers players